An engineer's degree is an advanced academic degree in engineering which is conferred in Europe, some countries of Latin America, North Africa and a few institutions in the United States. The degree may require a thesis but always requires a non-abstract project.

North America

Canada 
Through the Canadian Engineering Accreditation Board (CEAB), Engineers Canada accredits Canadian undergraduate engineering programs that meet the standards of the profession. Graduates of those programs are deemed by the profession to have the required academic qualifications to pursue further training towards becoming a licensed professional engineer in Canada.

In Canada, a CEAB-accredited engineer degree is the minimum academic requirement for registration as a P.Eng (professional engineer) anywhere in Canada and the standard against which all other engineering academic qualifications are measured.

A graduate of a non-CEAB-accredited program must demonstrate that his or her education is at least equivalent to that of a graduate of a CEAB-accredited program.

United States 
In the United States, the engineer's degree requires a year of study beyond a master's degree or two years from a bachelor's degree and often includes a requirement for a research thesis. 

At the U.S. Naval Postgraduate School the thesis is required to be "more extensive and complete in problem scope and solution than a master's thesis", although "not necessarily meeting the test of original research and contribution to fundamental knowledge that is applied to PhD dissertations." At UCLA, the engineer degree is explicitly set at the level of the preliminary PhD examination, i.e. not including the contribution to fundamental knowledge.

The engineer's degree was originally a first degree at the same level as a bachelor's degree. Rensselaer Polytechnic Institute was empowered by its 1824 charter to award Civil Engineer and Topographical Engineer degrees alongside the Bachelor in Science, and awarded the first Civil Engineer degrees in 1835. Civil Engineer degrees were also awarded by Dartmouth College (from 1845), the University of Michigan (from 1855) and by Yale University (from 1860), while Columbia University awarded Engineer of Mines degrees from 1867. By the early 20th-century engineer's degrees were commonly at graduate level – a survey by a committee of the Association of American Universities in 1916 found that this was the case in over two-thirds of the universities surveyed. The committee recommended that engineer's degrees  be reserved for study beyond master's level.

Latin America 
In Latin America, a degree or title of "Ingeniero" is awarded after completing five years of college.  This may be translated as "Engineer", however, its international academic equivalence depends on each country's educational system and can be compared to a six-year post-master's degree. Its award may imply obtaining a state licence to legally practice in the field or a professional certification outside the academic environment.

Chile 

In Chile, the educational system does not strictly follow that of the United States. University education is structured in four cycles, as Licenciatura (bachelor's degree), Título Profesional (professional title), Magíster (master's degree) and Doctorado (doctorate or Ph.D).

In this case, the engineer status is a general denomination for a person who has a professional title in engineering (Título Profesional en Ingeniería). The title is obtained after six years of study; in this way including a bachelor's degree in science, which is obtained after four years of study.

As in other countries, students only need to obtain the bachelor's degree to enter a master's degree or doctoral program, which commonly take two and three years, respectively. Since a professional title will take six years of study, after obtaining this title the graduate can enroll directly into a doctoral degree. In this manner, the international academic equivalence of a professional title in Chile corresponds to a six-year post-master's degree.

Mexico 

In Mexico, the educational system follows closely that of the United States. University education is structured in three cycles, as Licenciatura (bachelor's degree), Maestría (master's degree) and Doctorado (doctorate).

The Ingeniero (Engineer) degree is awarded depending on the nature of the studies pursued. In order to be called an Engineer, one must have passed certain courses related to engineering and been awarded a professional credential (cédula profesional) that certifies him or her as an engineer. The graduate has different abilities and capabilities related to the nature of the title Engineer. In this case, having a professional credential (cédula profesional) in engineering allows you to undertake various engineering-only activities and certifies the ability of the engineer to exercise their profession.

For engineering, completing all taught courses of a Licenciatura does not automatically award the graduate the title and licence of Ingeniero; for this, it depends on the name of the career and having the prefix Ingeniería attached to the name of the degree. It is the case that many people finish all courses in an engineering program, they obtain the diploma and title of Engineer and the professional credential, after getting their professional credential (cédula profesional).

Degrees in engineering require four to five years to complete. After this, the graduate may enroll in a postgraduate program, such as a master's degree or in exceptional cases, directly into a doctoral degree.

Europe (prior to the Bologna Process) 
Prior to the Bologna Process, In most countries of continental Europe, universities specializing in technical fields have traditionally awarded their students an engineer's degree after five years. This degree was typically the first university-awarded degree after finishing secondary education and completing it granted qualifications to further pursue a doctorate.

Following German custom in higher education, the engineer's degree is called Diplom. In addition to Germany itself, this system was common in states like Albania, Austria, Belarus, Belgium, Bosnia and Herzegovina, Bulgaria, Croatia, Czech Republic, Finland, Greece, Hungary, Montenegro, the Netherlands, Norway, Poland, Portugal, Romania, Russia, Serbia, Slovakia, Slovenia, Spain, Sweden and Switzerland.

Belgium 
In Belgium, there are three types of engineering degrees:

 "Burgerlijk Ingenieur" / "Ingénieur civil" or "Master of Science in Engineering" (abbrev. "ir.") - 5 years study (3 BSc. + 2 MSc.), delivered by universities.
 "Bio-ingenieur" / "Bioingénieur" or "Master of Science in Bioscience Engineering" (abbrev. "ir.") - 5 years study (3 BSc. + 2 MSc.), delivered by universities.
 "Industrieel Ingenieur" / "Ingénieur industriel" or "Master of Science in Engineering Technology" (abbrev. "Ing.") - five years study in French Community of Belgium (3 BSc. + 2 MSc.) or four years of study in the Flemish Community of Belgium (3 BSc. + 1 MSc.), delivered by universities.

Names are traditionally prefixed with the ir. and/or Ing. titles, although this practice is not as widespread as in the Netherlands. Use of these titles is regulated and protected by law.
Belgium is noteworthy as having a system under which demands made on students of engineering are particularly severe, especially in the first one or two years of the BSc degree.

Belarus and Ukraine 

In Belarus and Ukraine, the degree is спеціаліст інженер (specialist engineer), a first degree after five years of education.

Croatia, Bosnia-Herzegovina, North Macedonia, Montenegro, Serbia and Ex-Yugoslavia 
In Croatia, the old system included the engineer's degrees diplomirani inženjer (abbr. dipl.ing.) which was awarded by university faculties and a lower ranked engineer's degree inženjer (abbr. ing.) which was awarded by polytechnics, in a similar vein to the situation in the Netherlands. The old dipl.ing. degree could later be upgraded to a magistar (abbr. mr., Magister degree) and then a doktor (abbr. dr., Doctorate). The situation was the same in other countries previously part of Yugoslavia. In Serbian, the abbreviation is dipl.inž. Serbian titles of magistar (abbr. mr, Magister degree) and doktor (abbr. dr, Doctorate) in abbreviated versions are used without full stop as a punctuation mark at the end.

Czech Republic, Poland and Slovakia 

In the western Slavic-speaking countries, the engineer's degree is called inżynier (Polish), inžinier (Slovak) or inženýr (Czech) and the abbreviation is inż. in Poland and Ing. in the Czech Republic and Slovakia, which may be written before the person's name.

In the Czech Republic and Slovakia, the degree of Ing. is given for complete university studies in technical (like engineering), economic or agricultural fields. In one of these cases it can be equivalent to a Master of Science in Engineering.

In Poland, the degree of inżynier is available after 3.5 or 4 years of studies (like the licencjat in non-engineering science) after a final thesis is completed. A magister inżynier (abbreviated mgr inż.) refers to a Master of Science in Engineering, after completing five years of study and a written thesis. Originally there were "inżynier" studies that lasted for four years and afterward one could obtain the "magister" title in two years of studies—the total of six years resulted in two degrees, "magister" and "inżynier". In the early 1960s a new track of studies was developed to speed up education and the "magister inżynier" five-year track was created. Whichever way one obtained the education the "magister inżynier" (mgr inż. before the name) was the equivalent degree with "inżynier" designating the professional level and "magister" designating the academic level.
After the Bologna process the first level is "inżynier," obtainable after nominally three years of studies (although some are longer) with the same professional privileges as before and "masters" after one or two years gives the same academic and professional designation as before. But the ultimate shortening of the period of studies resulted in some professional groups (e.g. architects) demanding that "magister inżynier" be made a basis for professional rights.

Finland 

In Finnish, the engineer's degree is called diplomi-insinööri and abbreviated dipl.ins., DI or M.Sc.(Tech.). It is possible to obtain after five years of studying or even faster, but the average is around six years. Under the Bologna process, this is split into two parts, the first being one where the students can get the intermediate tekniikan kandidaatti (B.Sc.(Tech.)) degree.

The degree of insinööri (AMK) is a bachelor's degree from a Finnish University of Applied Sciences (ammattikorkeakoulu), similar to a German Fachhochschule, but it is not interchangeable with the academic tekniikan kandidaatti.

Due to the Bologna process, a new master's degree called Insinööri (ylempi AMK) or Master of Engineering has been introduced. It carries a requirement of two years of work experience after the degree of insinööri (AMK) and further studies.

France, Morocco, Tunisia, and Algeria 

In France, Morocco, Tunisia, and Algeria there are two main ways to become an engineer:

 Have a Diplôme d'Ingénieur, delivered by the grandes écoles in engineering.
 Have a master's degree in science, delivered by the public universities.

The Diplôme d'Ingénieur is a postgraduate degree in engineering usually awarded by the grandes écoles in engineering. It is generally obtained after five to seven years of studies after the baccalauréat.

Each holder of the Diplôme d'Ingénieur is conferred the title of ingénieur diplômé (graduate engineer). This is distinguished from the term ingénieur (engineer) which is less-regulated. The diplôme d'ingénieur is recognized as Master of Science in Engineering in the United States and in the countries of the European Union (also in France).

Most grandes écoles give the opportunity to their students to join a double degree with a University (in France or abroad). Furthermore, Diplôme d'Ingénieur graduates can pursue a selective Ph.D. after their engineering studies to later join academia or an industrial R&D department.

In France, any institution issuing the Diplôme d'Ingénieur must be accredited by the Commission des Titres d'Ingénieur. The best institutions are usually part of the Conférence des Grandes écoles.

France, Morocco, Tunisia, Algeria are particular in that it is mainly the grandes écoles in engineering that are accredited and are certified to issue the Diplôme d'Ingénieur, which is differentiated from bachelor's and master's degrees in engineering issued by public universities (universités). Universities in France, Morocco, Tunisia, and Algeria are comprehensive institutions composed of several faculties covering various fields (natural sciences, engineering, law, economics, medicine, humanities, etc.) with a large student body. On the other hand, grandes écoles in engineering are much smaller in size and recruit their students with more selective processes (typically a few hundred students per year per institution, and a few thousand students per year country-wide).

Germany and Austria 

In German, the traditional engineer's degree is called Diplom-Ingenieur (Dipl.-Ing., in Austria DI is  also used). This supersedes "Ing. (Grad)", the old form in Germany. This degree is generally equivalent to a Master's degree, which is not to be confused with the old Magister degree. Most programs that used to lead to a Dipl.-Ing. degree lead to master's degrees today, as the Diplom-Ingenieur as an academic title is phased out because of the Bologna Process. However, some universities continue to hand out so-called equivalence certificates that certify the equivalence of a Dipl.-Ing. with the newly introduced M.Sc. degrees.

The German "Universities of Applied Sciences" (Fachhochschule) award the traditional engineering degree Diplom-Ingenieur (FH) (Dipl.-Ing. (FH)). A requirement for the degree is to write a Diplom thesis. This is also being modified by the Bologna Process, as bachelor's and master's degrees from a University of Applied Sciences are equal to degrees from a traditional university.
Universities of Applied Sciences were phased out and, despite some retaining the term "Applied Sciences", have been reorganized into universities with their own faculties and research institutes. These universities are often strongly focused on fields such as computer science, engineering or business schools. Subjects like Law or Human Medicine etc. which requires a Staatsexamen (state exam) can only be studied at traditional universities. Since 2009, most Universities in Germany offer bachelor's degree programmes (B.Sc., B.Eng., M.Sc., M.Eng, M.C.A. and others) and Master programmes that lead to the academic degree Master of Science, Master of Engineering, Master of Business Administration and others.

In Austria there also exists the Ingenieur (abbreviated as Ing.). This is not an academic degree as it is given to graduates of HTLs (Höhere Technische Lehranstalt), secondary schools with technical focus. The Austrian engineers' law (Ingenieurgesetz 2017) specifies the criteria for obtaining the title: graduation from a technical high school (HTL), verifiable practical experience of three years, and an oral examination with a certified committee to prove advanced skills and knowledge in their field. Since 2017, Ingenieur titles obtained under these criteria are included in the National Qualifications Framework on level 6, the same level as that of the bachelor's degree. However, the Ingenieur does not entitle to direct admission to university Master's degree programmes.

Greece 
In Greece, the title of "Engineer" is awarded by higher education institutions. There are two types of engineer. The title "Diplomate Engineer" (Diplomate in Greek: Διπλωματούχος; Kάτοχος ενός Διπλώματος/Δίπλωμα/Diploma; Diploma holder) is awarded after completion of a five-year undergraduate engineering degree (diploma) programme at a polytechnic university. These degrees are 300 ECTS credits, leading to a qualification at ISCED level 7, equivalent to an integrated master's degree.

The title of "Graduate Engineer"(Greek translation: "Πτυχιούχος Μηχανικός", English explanation: "Bachelor of Engineering Degree Holder"), is awarded after completion of a four-year (three and a half years from 1983 to 1995) undergraduate engineering degree programme at a technological educational institute (TEI). These are 240 (previously 210, 1983–1995) ECTS credits leading to an award at ISCED level 6, equivalent to a bachelor's degree. TEIs existed from 1983 to 2019; they were reformed between 2013 and 2019 and their departments incorporated into existing higher education institutions.

Italy 
In Italy until 2001 there were two degrees: a three-year diploma in ingegneria (BEng level, title abbrev. "dipl. ing.") and a five-year laurea in ingegneria (MEng level, title abbrev. "ing."). Since 2001 reform, the bachelor's level is called laurea (abbrev. "L") and master's degree level is called laurea specialistica or laurea magistrale (abbrev. "LS"). Accordingly, today after three years of engineering studies, the degree called laurea in ingegneria (BEng level) and the title of dottore in Ingegneria (abbrev. "dott.") can be obtained. After two additional years of engineering studies, the degree called laurea magistrale in ingegneria (MEng level) and the title of dottore magistrale in Ingegneria (abbrev. "dott.") can be obtained. After a "state exam" one becomes "Ingegnere" (abbrev. Ing). In Italy the state accreditation system, degrees and titles are regulated by state law. See regulations (in Italian) DM 4 Agosto 2000 for "laurea" (bachelor) and DM 28 Novembre 2000 for "laurea specialistica" (BEng (Hon)-master). Chartered professions (including engineering) are regulated by state law 328/01 ("D.P.R. 5 giugno 2001, n. 328").

Netherlands 
In the Netherlands, somebody holding an engineer's degree is an ingenieur. There are two types of engineers with different abbreviations:
 ir. is obtained by university graduates (Wetenschappelijk onderwijs or WO). It is at academic level and the highest engineer qualification. - five years study (3 B.Sc. + 2 M.Sc.), or 6 years for engineers that graduated prior to the Bologna agreement.
 ing. is obtained by graduates from polytechnics (hoger beroeps onderwijs or HBO). - four years study (4 B.Eng. or B.ASc.)

Names are traditionally prefixed with the ir. or ing. titles. Use of these titles is regulated and protected by Dutch law. Under the Bologna agreement, the titles are increasingly interchanged with the English-language degrees (B.Sc. for ing., M.Sc. for ir.).

Completion of Dutch engineering qualifications has historically demanded a lot of effort and talent. On average the four-year course takes 4.5 years to finish.

Portugal 

In Portugal, Engineer (feminine: engenheira, abrev.: eng.) is a professional degree reserved for the effective members of the Portuguese Institution of the Engineers (OE, Ordem dos Engenheiros) and Portuguese Institution of Technical Engineers (OET, Ordem dos Engenheiros Técnicos). There is not an academic degree of engenheiro, despite the title being used informally to refer to anyone who has a degree in engineering, even a nonmember of the OE or OET.

Until the Bologna Process, having a licenciado (five-year) degree in engineering was a previous condition to be able to be admitted to the OE. Presently, admission to the OE requires a post-Bologna licenciado (3 years) degree or a mestre (five-year) master in engineering. OE members holders of a post-Bologna licenciado degree are now classified as E1 grade engineers, while holders of a pre-Bologna licenciado or a mestre are classified as E2 grade engineers.

Romania and Moldova 

Romania and Moldova followed the French system. One needs a baccalaureate diploma to be accepted at the university. The engineering degree was called Diploma de inginer and the graduate was called a Inginer diplomat. These five years of study are equivalent to a Bologna Master (M.Sc/M.Eng/MCA). The five-year course concludes with a comprehensive set of specialising exams (examen de diploma). Marks nine and 10 are considered exceptional. Some universities had called Diploma de Sub-inginer which was a three-year course equivalent with a college degree. Following the Bologna process, the graduates obtain the Inginer licentiat degree, after following a four-year program. In this case the Inginer Master degree is obtained after an additional one- or two-year graduate program.

Spain 
The situation in Spain is very similar to France but without the grandes écoles and Germany-UK in relation to the Technical Engineering Degrees. Long cycle Engineer's degrees (Ingenieros) traditionally used to be (at least nominally) six-year programs but the tendency since the mid-1990s has been to reduce them to five years. The last step to get the degree is the Proyecto de Fin de Carrera (Degree Project), which involves a combination of application development and some research work. Students submit a dissertation that they have to defend. The Spanish official name for the degree is Ingeniero (Engineer) or other degree called Ingeniero Técnico (Technical Engineer), which is a three to four years degree (involving also a Final Degree Project) and is equivalent to a Bachelor of Engineering, the Technical Engineer in Spain has full competencies and legal authority in their field; however, certain engineering professions require by law a master's degree in their respective field, a degree called "master habilitante" or "habilitating master's degree".  A distinctive characteristic of Spanish engineering degrees is that the average duration of studies up to graduation is about 40 percent above the nominal duration and that the drop-out rate is considerable due to stricter examination standards.

Sweden 
There are two different engineering degrees that belong to the so called professional degrees: civilingenjör (Master of Science in Engineering), which requires five years of study and högskoleingenjör (Bachelor of Science in Engineering), which amounts to three years. Both programmes admit students directly from secondary education.

United Kingdom 

The highest engineer qualification in the UK and Ireland is the Chartered Engineer (C.Eng) which is a minimum of eight years but usually 12 years of education, training and professional peer reviewed practice process. Chartered Engineer is a terminal qualification. The academic qualification, which is minimum for gaining chartership in engineering, is the Master of Engineering (MEng) or BEng plus MSc or MA in addition to four to six years peer-reviewed professional practice including a project report / thesis. In England, Northern Ireland and Wales this is a four-year course or a 'sandwich' five-year course (with one year spent working in industry). In Scotland, it is a five-year course. The Bachelor of Engineering (BEng) is usually a three-year course (four in Scotland) or can also include a year in industry. Many universities offer the BEng and may then allow a transfer to the MEng.

The City and Guilds of London Institute have established a recognised route to higher engineering qualifications with the Institution of Engineering and Technology (IET), the Institution of Mechanical Engineers (IMechE) and The Institution of Civil Engineers (ICE). CGLI has align the Graduate Diploma (level 6) and Postgraduate Diploma (level 7) with the registration requirements for Incorporated Engineer and Chartered Engineer status. The Graduate Diploma is set at the same level as the final year of a British BEng and its Postgraduate Diploma is set at the same level as the final year of a British MEng.
UK Professional institutions have delegated authority from the engineering council to approve university degrees and also award the Chartered Engineer qualification in a specific discipline.  For example, IMechE awards C.Eng, MIMechE, ICE awards CEng, MICE and IET awards CEng, MIET.

Engineers who have been awarded a BEng (Ordinary) or BEng (Honours) and have appropriate training and experience in the workplace are able to apply to become an Incorporated Engineer (IEng), if the qualification has been accepted for this classification, by the engineering council. If an engineer has studied beyond the BEng for an MSc or has an MEng, they may apply to become a Chartered Engineer (CEng), once they have completed the required amount of postgraduate work-based competency training and experience. Competency and training requirements are met over a period of four to eight years in practice for a total of eight to 12 years education, training and professional responsibility. Formal structured postgraduate training schemes such as the monitored professional development programme administered by IMechE enables the engineer in training to satisfy the requirements for Chartered Engineer faster.[5]

Uniquely the Institution of Structural Engineers requires candidates for chartered status to undertake both a professional review interview and a seven-hour written examination. The examination tests the candidates' ability to demonstrate:-

 An understanding of structural engineering principles
 An ability to initiate and communicate structural design
 An ability to provide effective and viable solutions to a structural design problem

Chartered Engineer and Incorporated Engineer titles awarded by the Engineering Council UK, are similar but not equivalent to North American Professional Engineer (PEng/PE) and Professional Technologist (PTech) designations, but with often a far greater geographical recognition. The UK and North American system of regulating engineering professional qualifications is very different and not equivalent. In the US and Canada engineering is a regulated profession in terms of practice and enforced by law and licensing. It is more than the regulation of engineering titles—like the UK. This means that many UK chartered Engineers who are grandfathered to the title or are non degree holders (HNC/HND) will not be recognized formally as professional engineers in Canada and US. There is strict interpretation of qualifications and education because there are legal implications. There is no back door entry or experiential exemption from the formal academic requirements. This is simply because of the legal legislation on practice. This licensed based engineering governance legal framework does not exist in the UK.

MIET-Member of the Institution of Engineering and Technology is recognised as regulated engineering profession by virtue of the Statutory Instruments n.2007/2781-The European Communities (Recognition of Professional Qualifications) Regulation 2007-Directive European Union 2005/36/EC.

This meaning retains the 19th century idea that "real" engineers were military personnel, while "other" engineers were civilians.

Europe (according to the Bologna Process) 

Following the introduction of the Bologna process, universities divide higher-education studies in three cycles, corresponding to a three to four-year bachelor's degree, a one to two-year master's degree and a doctoral degree. Accordingly, engineering studies are now divided in two parts: first, the bachelor's degree (baccalaureus, three to four years) and the second optional part (one to two years), after which either the traditional engineer's degree or a master's degree (e.g. MEng or MSc) is awarded. These can often, however, still be combined into a single 'integrated' degree programme in many countries, normally lasting five or six years (although only four years in England, Wales and Northern Ireland).  But in the UK when one considers the whole formation of a fully qualified Chartered Engineer or Incorporated Engineer it is a minimum of eight years. Countries have varied in the implementation of the Bologna process, meaning the combination of first (bachelor's) and second (master's) cycles, even when taken as a single degree, can last from four to six years, although many countries have set five years as the minimum.

Most traditional universities continue to have a primary academic degree program, for example, a five-year Civilingenjör in Sweden, that is distinct from the 3+2 scheme that awards the bachelor's and master's degrees but a student who has done both at a Swedish technical university will in most cases also fulfill the requirements for the civilingenjör degree.

In France, an important part of engineering is taught in écoles d’ingénieurs, which are part of the French grandes écoles system. Since the Bologna Process, the Diplôme d’ingénieur is officially considered to be at the level of a master's degree.

Notably, Europe has the international professional engineering qualification and title of European Engineer (EUR ING) which is obtained through peer review after seven years of education, training and professional experience.

Russia 

As of 2012 in Russia, following degrees correspond to the "engineer's degree" in the sense of this article:
 Инженер - "engineer", which was formerly awarded after four, five, six years of study, may also contain clarification on the nature of engineering field, such as "mining engineer" or "systems engineer".
 Инженер по специальности - "engineer at specialty" (where specialty's name is mentioned), currently awarded after five or six years of study, may also contain clarification on the nature of engineering field, such as "engineer-ecologist at specialty Rational usage of natural resources and protection of the environment"
 Инженер-исследователь по специальности - "engineer-researcher at specialty" (where specialty's name is mentioned), was formerly awarded after seven years of study
 Бакалавр по направлению - "bachelor at area" (where area's name is mentioned), currently awarded after four years of study and "area" is an engineering area, corresponding to one or more of former "specialties"
 Магистр по направлению - "magister (master) at area" (where area's name is mentioned), currently awarded after two years of study to those already having any higher-education degree and "area" is an engineering area, corresponding to one or more of former "specialties"
Anything but "bachelor" is considered "second-level" higher education and gives access to postgraduate education for "candidate of sciences" degree, "bachelor" is considered "first-level" higher education degree and gives access to study for master's (magister) degree.

Post-graduate scientific degrees in engineering areas include кандидат технических наук - "candidate of technical sciences" and доктор технических наук - "doctor of technical sciences". Sometimes in English translations "...of technical sciences" is exchanged for "...of engineering".

Turkey 
In Turkey, typical length of study for bachelor's degree at any engineering program is four years. Owner of a valid degree which is given by an engineering faculty at Turkish universities, can be called Mühendis, meaning "Engineers". The "Mühendis" title is limited by law to people with a valid engineering degree and the use of the title by others (even persons with much more work experience) is illegal. (Law No: 3458 Law about Engineers and Architects 28.06.1938 Publish no:3945) A person may earn a master's degree in the same field as the bachelor's and be called as "Yüksek Mühendis" (meaning Higher Engineer). Most Turkish engineering programs are accredited to European system by Bologna process.

Asia

Bangladesh 
In Bangladesh, the engineering degree is referred to as BSc Engineering (Bachelor of Science in Engineering) at the undergraduate level. Likewise, a master's degree is referred to as Master of Engineering (M.Engg.) and Master of Science in Engineering (MSc.Engg.). At the undergraduate level, the course takes four years, only except being in the case of Urban and Regional Planning discipline, where it usually takes five years. In postgraduate education, pursuing a master's degree in any engineering discipline usually takes one to one and a half years. Graduated engineers who are members of either Institution of Engineers, Bangladesh (IEB) or Institution of Textile Engineers and Technologists (ITET) are legally and formally allowed to use the title "Engr." before their names.

India 
The engineering courses in India are regulated and set up under the aegis of the University Grants Commission of India (UGC), All India Council for Technical Education (AICTE) and National Board of Accreditation (NBA).

In India, engineering qualifications include the following:
 Bachelor's degrees (four years after class 12 and three years after Diploma in Engineering): BE (Bachelor of Engineering) and BTech (Bachelor of Technology). Both are the same. Admission is usually through an engineering entrance examination.
 Master's degrees (two or more years after BE and BTech): ME (Master of Engineering), MTech (Master of Technology) and MSc (Eng) (Master of Science in Engineering). Admission usually requires qualification in the Graduate Aptitude Test in Engineering or some work experience in an engineering field. The MTech and ME degrees are same and of two years' duration. MTech/ME usually has coursework in the first year and a project in the second year. The MSc (Eng) degree is usually research oriented and may requires two or more years to complete.
 Doctoral degrees (three to five years): PhD (Doctor of Philosophy). Admission requirements vary across universities but usually include a master's degree in engineering or a bachelor's degree in engineering with an exceptionally good academic record.

Pakistan 
In Pakistan, engineering qualifications include the following:

 BE (Bachelor of Engineering) or BS/BSc Engineering (Bachelor of Science in Engineering) - four years' duration.
 ME (Master of Engineering) or MS/MSc Engineering (Master of Science in Engineering) - 1.5 to 2 years' duration.
 PhD (Engineering) - minimum three years' duration.

Pakistan Engineering Council (PEC) is the responsible government body for accreditation of undergraduate engineering degrees, registration of engineers and regulation of engineering profession. PEC is a full signatory of Washington Accord and International Professional Engineer (IntPE) Agreement (IPEA).

Vietnam 

In Vietnam, the engineer's degree is called Bằng kỹ sư, the first degree after five years of study. The Ministry of Education of Vietnam has also issued separate regulations for the naming of degrees not in accordance with international regulation. The Engineer's degree is named "The Degree of Engineer" in the degree (e.g. The Degree of Engineer in Information Technology). Since 30/12/2019, The Degree of Engineer, Doctor and architecture has been classified at 7th rank, it means having the same rank with a master's degree.

See also 
 Institute of technology

References

External links 
 Database of regulated professions in the EU.

Academic degrees
Degrees
Academic degrees of the United States